William Edward Robinson (2 February 1949 – 8 February 2020) was a Canadian basketball player. He competed in the men's tournament at the 1976 Summer Olympics. He died following a stroke in 2020, shortly after his 71st birthday.

References

External links
 

1949 births
2020 deaths
Basketball players at the 1976 Summer Olympics
Canadian men's basketball players
1974 FIBA World Championship players
Olympic basketball players of Canada
People from the Cowichan Valley Regional District
Simon Fraser Clan men's basketball players
Basketball people from British Columbia
1970 FIBA World Championship players